Ethan Vanacore-Decker (born October 6, 1994) is an American professional soccer player who currently plays for the Richmond Kickers in USL League One.

He is a resident of the Manahawkin section of Stafford Township, New Jersey and attended the Pennington School.

Career

Early career
Vanacore-Decker initially committed to beginning his college soccer career at University of North Carolina at Chapel Hill, before changing to the University of Connecticut, where he played for two years. Vanacore-Decker transferred to the University of Louisville in 2015. He again moved colleges in 2016, opting to attend Rutgers University. He was ineligible for their 2016 season due to NCAA transfer rules.

While at college, Vanacore-Decker played with USL PDL side New York Red Bulls U-23 in 2015, and South Florida Surf in 2016 and 2017. Following college, Vanacore-Decker remained playing in the PDL with North County United.

Professional
On August 10, 2018, Vanacore-Decker signed with USL club Swope Park Rangers. He made his professional debut on August 29, 2018, appearing as a 61st-minute substitute in a 2–1 win over Tulsa Roughnecks.

Vanacore-Decker joined USL League One expansion club Northern Colorado Hailstorm on January 28, 2022.

On July 18, 2022, Vanacore-Decker was acquired by Richmond Kickers in exchange for an international roster spot.

Career statistic

References

1994 births
Living people
American soccer players
UConn Huskies men's soccer players
Louisville Cardinals men's soccer players
Rutgers Scarlet Knights men's soccer players
New York Red Bulls U-23 players
South Florida Surf players
Sporting Kansas City II players
Union Omaha players
Northern Colorado Hailstorm FC players
Richmond Kickers players
Association football forwards
Soccer players from New Jersey
USL League Two players
USL Championship players
People from Stafford Township, New Jersey
Sportspeople from Ocean County, New Jersey
The Pennington School alumni